Yenkuy is a village in the Sanaba Department of Banwa Province in western Burkina Faso. As of 2005, it had a population of 278.

References

Populated places in the Boucle du Mouhoun Region
Banwa Province